Kirsty Balfour (born 21 February 1984), also known by her married name Kirsty Kettles, is a Scottish former competitive swimmer who represented Great Britain in the Olympic Games, FINA world championships and European championships, and competed for Scotland in the Commonwealth Games.  She specialized in breaststroke events.

She won a gold medal in the 200-metre breaststroke at the European Long-Course Championships in 2006, and took silver in same event at the World Championships in Melbourne in 2007.

She announced her retirement from swimming on 7 November 2008, stating she planned to do more work for her church.  She got married the following day.

Personal bests and records held

References

External links
 
 British Olympic Association athlete profile
 

1984 births
Living people
Female breaststroke swimmers
European Aquatics Championships medalists in swimming
Olympic swimmers of Great Britain
Scottish female swimmers
Sportspeople from Edinburgh
Swimmers at the 2004 Summer Olympics
Swimmers at the 2006 Commonwealth Games
Swimmers at the 2008 Summer Olympics
World Aquatics Championships medalists in swimming
Commonwealth Games medallists in swimming
Commonwealth Games silver medallists for Scotland
Medallists at the 2006 Commonwealth Games